Charles Lamb wrote, as Elia, 16 popular fallacies.

Lamb's popular fallacies (all printed in 1826) were born in response to a specific socio-linguistic context and expose the pretences that constitute false social behavior. Three of the fallacies, “That You Must Love Me and Love My Dog,” “That We Should Lie Down With the Lamb,” and “That We Should Rise With the Lark” all feature prominent animal imagery.

See also
 Essays of Elia
 Henry Watson Fowler

References 

British essays